Nelson Marcelo San Martín Arriagada (born 17 May 1980) is a Chilean former professional footballer who played as a midfielder.

Club career
As a child, San Martín was with the Colo-Colo youth team until the age of 15. Then he moved to the traditional rival Universidad de Chile. The former Universidad de Chile midfielder who began to pitch his tent in Alor Star in November 2006 has been playing an influential role for Kedah FA. He excels in his role as the playmaker of the team with his accurate distribution of the ball. In his first year at his new club, he managed to capture the eyes of most Kedah FA fans with his superb passing and vision, and also with an excellent free kick delivery.

Alongside his teammates, Ahmad Fauzi Saari, Marlon Alex James, Mohd Khyril Muhymeen Zambri, they played the most attractive football in Malaysia. Two years playing for the Canaries, Nelson assisted them to win historical double treble titles. 

Eventually, after seeing the domination of foreign footballers in Malaysian football, Football Association of Malaysia ordered all the clubs to release all imports player for the M.League 2009 season.
Martín played his last game for Kedah FA on 23 August 2008, which was Malaysia Cup showdown against Selangor FA. He set up a goal for Marlon Alex James and struck a high-quality goal in the match which ended with Kedah won 3-2.
Upon his contributions to Kedah FA, he was awarded the Ahli Cemerlang Semangat Jerai (ASK) medal from the Sultan of Kedah.

After his departure from Malaysia, Nelson went to neighbors Thailand and played 1 season with Bangkok Glass and later on relocated to Singapore in order to join Home United FC in a 6-month contract. A 3-month injury caused Nelson to miss half of his season with Home United, causing his contract to not be extended.

Nelson then left Southeast Asia and went on to sign with Chilean club, Athletic Club Barnechea for the 2011/12 season.

He was released by Barnechea in mid-2012 after a poor season with the club.

In November 2012, Nelson return to Kedah to play for the Canaries in the 2013 Malaysia Premier League. After only a season with them, he joined PBDKT T-Team FC for the 2014 Malaysia Super League season.

Honours

Club
 Universidad de Chile
Primera División de Chile: 2000
Copa Chile: 2000

Kedah FA
Malaysian Super League: 2006–07, 2007–08
Malaysia Cup: 2007, 2008
Malaysia FA Cup: 2007, 2008

References

External links

 Peloteros Chilenos en el Mundo

1980 births
Living people
Chilean footballers
Chilean expatriate footballers
Chilean Primera División players
Universidad de Chile footballers
Deportes Temuco footballers
Unión San Felipe footballers
Segunda División players
CD Numancia players
Tercera División de Chile players
Primera B de Chile players
Curicó Unido footballers
A.C. Barnechea footballers
Ascenso MX players
Altamira F.C. players
Malaysia Super League players
Kedah Darul Aman F.C. players
Terengganu F.C. II players
Nelson San Martin
Nelson San Martin
Singapore Premier League players
Home United FC players
Chilean football managers
Chilean expatriate football managers
Chilean expatriate sportspeople in Spain
Chilean expatriate sportspeople in Mexico
Chilean expatriate sportspeople in Malaysia
Chilean expatriate sportspeople in Thailand
Chilean expatriate sportspeople in Singapore
Expatriate footballers in Spain
Expatriate footballers in Mexico
Expatriate footballers in Malaysia
Expatriate footballers in Thailand
Expatriate footballers in Singapore
Expatriate football managers in Malaysia
Association football midfielders